The Tour of Limburg may refer to:

 Ronde van Limburg (Belgium), a cycling race in Limburg, Belgium
 Ronde van Limburg (Netherlands), a cycling race in South Limburg, Netherlands